Ian Davies may refer to:

 Ian Davies (footballer) (born 1957), English former footballer
 Ian Davies (basketball) (1956–2013), Australian basketball player
 Ian Rees Davies (1942–2014), Vice-Chancellor of the University of Hong Kong
 Ian Puleston-Davies (born 1958), British actor and writer
 Ian Davies (rugby union), (born 1978), Welsh rugby union referee
 Ian Davies (photographer), (born 1965), British photographer

See also
 Ian Davis (disambiguation)